Nehru Homeopathic Medical College (NHMC) is a homeopathic medical college located in New Delhi. The college offers two courses in the field of homeopathic education A Bachelor of Homeopathic Medicine and Surgery (B.H.M.S) and MD (Hom). NHMC has been affiliated with University of Delhi since 1992 and functions under the Government of Delhi. It is regarded as one of the topmost and premier Homeopathic Medical Colleges for B.H.M.S in India.

History 
NHMC and Hospital attached to it was founded by Padma Bhushan winner Yudhvir Singh.  The foundation stone of the college building was laid by Sushila Nayyar, Minister of Health and Family Welfare, India  on 22 August 1963. The OPD Wing was inaugurated by Lal Bahadur Shastri on 6 May 1964. Classes in the college were commenced from 1967 for DHMS Course, upgraded to BHMS course under the Board of Homoeopathic System of Medicine. On 1 September 1972 this institution was handed over by the Yudhvir Singh Charitable Trust to University of Delhi Administration.

After the procurement of Nehru Homoeopathic Medical College and Hospital by Government of Delhi, Jugal Kishore was made its first director.

Controversies

COVID-19 Hospital objection 
On 16 April 2020 NHMC & Hospital was declared to be dedicated for the COVID-19 patients by Delhi government. After this decision many of the Defence Colony residents living near the hospital premises had raised their concerns about hospital management and safety issues in handling COVID-19 patients. Major (Retired) Ranjit Singh, the President of the Defence Colony RWA had also written a letter to Delhi Chief Minister Arvind Kejriwal about the risks associated with shifting COVID-19 patients to Nehru hospital and also raised questions on reliability of homeopathic hospitals. However, Anu Kapoor, Medical Superintendent of Nehru Hospital told Mail Today that they were only in preparation mode for converting the hospital into a dedicated COVID-19 hospital at that time.

See also 
 Central Council of Homeopathy
 National Institute of Homoeopathy

References

External links 
 

Universities and colleges in Delhi
Ministry of AYUSH
Homeopathic education
Medical colleges in Delhi
Delhi University